Valmy is a small unincorporated community in the town of Sevastopol, where WIS 57 splits with County Highway T in Door County. The community serves as a gateway to the nearby Whitefish Dunes State Park as well as Cave Point County Park.

Gallery

References

External links
 Valmy Thresharee history by Ralph Bochek, Don Rudolph and Pete Devlin, Access Door County, 31:48 long video

Unincorporated communities in Wisconsin
Unincorporated communities in Door County, Wisconsin